A Long Finish is a 1998 novel by Michael Dibdin, and is the sixth entry in the popular Aurelio Zen series.

Synopsis 
After his adventures under sun-drenched Neapolitan skies in Cosi Fan Tutti, Italian police detective Aurelio Zen finds himself reluctantly back in Rome, sneezing in the damp wine cellar of a retired but still powerful and connected mover and shaker. Strings are pulled and he is given another unorthodox assignment: find evidence that clears the jailed scion of an important wine-growing family, who is accused of brutal murder, in time to harvest what is anticipated to be a great vintage.

Zen is confronted with the closed ranks and closed mouths of a small, remote rural town, where everyone knows the secrets of everyone else. Grappling with tangled relationships, bitter resentments and grudges reaching back to the immediate post-war years, his investigations are further distracted by meeting the young woman who thinks she is his daughter.

1998 British novels
Novels by Michael Dibdin
Novels set in Rome
Faber and Faber books